Decorative Designers AKA "DD" (1895–1931) was an American firm of artists, each of whom designed various aspects of books and other publications, "an early example of division of labor in creative work."  The "DD" monogram appears on more than 25,000 book covers, dust jackets, and text decorations of the late 19th and early 20th centuries.

Members
 Henry W. Thayer (1867–1940), co-founder
 Emma Reddington Lee Thayer (1874–1973), co-founder
 Charles Buckles Falls (1874–1960)
 Jay Chambers (1877–1929)
 Rome K. Richardson 
 Adam Empie

See also
 Charles Buckles Falls
 Howard Pyle
 John Espey
 American Pre-Raphaelites
 Morris & Co.
 American Union of Decorative Artists and Craftsmen

References

External sources
 Smithsonian: Decorative Designers (Firm)
 University of Pennsylvania:  Decorative Designers. bdd
 Galleries of Decorative Designers work
 Gallery Archive of Richard Minsky

American art movements